Julien Day School (JDS) is a co-educational primary, secondary and senior secondary school based in Kolkata, West Bengal, India and its outskirts. It is run by The Julien Educational Trust, a private organisation of people of the Anglo-Indian community, and operates four branches in Kolkata (Elgin Road), Ganganagar, Kalyani and Howrah. The school was founded by Late Mrs. Grace Julien, and governed by the Board of Trustees.

The Julien Day School was established at Kolkata in 1969, Ganganagar in 1976, Kalyani in 1988 and Howrah in 2007 are all affiliated to the Council for the Indian School Certificate Examinations, New Delhi with I.C.S.E. at the class X level and I.S.C. at the class XII level comprising three streams viz. Science, Commerce, Humanities (Arts). The Howrah  Branch was established in 2007.

There are three major vacations during the year. The Summer Vacation in May–June, the Durga Puja Vacation in September–October and the Christmas Vacation in December–January.

Campuses 
 Julien Day School, Kolkata 
Julien Day School, Ganganagar
Julien Day School, Kalyani
Julien Day School, Howrah

Notable Alumni 
 Soham Das, Banker and Financial Advisor

References

External links 
 

Primary schools in West Bengal
High schools and secondary schools in West Bengal
Schools in Kolkata
Educational institutions established in 1969
1969 establishments in West Bengal